Sorcerer is a Swedish epic doom band from Stockholm, which was founded in 1988, disbanded in 1992 and re-formed in 2010.

History
The original 1988 band consisted of bassist Johnny Hagel, drummer Tommy Karlsson and guitarist Peter Furulid. In 1989, singer Anders Engberg (Lion's Share) and a second guitarist, Mats Liedholm, joined the band. In the same year, the group recorded their first demo Anno 1503, of which 1,500 copies were sold, and the band played two gigs in Stockholm, the first with Count Raven and the second at a festival with other bands, including Entombed, Carnage, Therion and Mezzrow, all of which were playing their first show. In the same year the sampler Rockbox was published, including "Born with Fire". In 1990 Richard Evensand joined Sorcerer as new drummer. In 1992 Sorcerer recorded their second demo, The Inquisition, which included a demo version of the Rainbow song "Stargazer". Later that year, Hagel left the band to join Tiamat. Shortly thereafter, the band disbanded. According to Hagel, his departure was not the reason for the band's dissolution, but the lack of motivation and lack of time of the remaining band members. In 1995, John Perez of Solitude Aeturnus released both demos as a compilation on his label Brainticket Records, Brainticket's first release. Perez and Hail had known each other since the first Sorcerer demo.

In 2010, Oliver Weinsheimer offered the band a slot at the German Hammer of Doom Festival. Sorcerer consisted of Hagel and Engberg and friends of the two. Kristian Niemann and Ola Englund played electric guitar and Robert Iversen the drums. In 2011, Perez re-released the remastered demos. As a bonus, three previously unreleased songs, "Wisdom", "Northern Seas" and "At Dawn", were included. The same year, the band played at the Up the Hammers Festival in Athens, and work began on the debut album. In 2012, Englund left the band to join Six Feet Under; Peter Hallgren joined as a replacement. In the following years, the band continued to work on the album, then the recorded –material was mixed and mastered by drummer Robert Iversen. The album was mastered by Jens Bogren and released in 2015 under the name In the Shadow of the Inverted Cross on Metal Blade Records.

In 2016, during the recording of the next studio album Iversen left the band and Lars Sköld filled the role as session drummer on the album. The second album, The Crowning of the Fire King was published via Metal Blade in 2017, and was chosen as "album of the month" in the German Rock Hard magazine.

In 2018 Hagel decided to take a step back as an active bandmember, although he would stay involved with the band and in songwriting. Hagel replaced by Justin Biggs.

In the beginning of 2020 the band recorded their third studio album, which released in May 2020 with the title Lamenting Of The Innocent.

In August 2022, Sorcerer performed their first ever UK show at Bloodstock Festival.

Personnel

Members 

Current members
 Anders Engberg – vocals (1988–1992, 2010–present)
 Kristian Niemann – guitars (2010–present)
 Peter Hallgren – guitars (2012–present)
 Justin Biggs – bass (2018–present)
 Richard Evensand – drums (1990–1992, 2017–present)

Former members
 Johnny Hagel – bass (1988–1992, 2010-2018)
 Peter Furulid – guitars (1988-1992)
 Mats Liedholm – guitars (1988-1992)
 Ola Englund – guitars (2010-2012)
 Robert Iversen – drums (2010-2016)
 Tommy Karlsson – drums (1988-1990)

Session member
 Lars Sköld – drums (2016)

Style
According to Nadine Fiebig in Nuclear Blast Magazine, In the Shadow of the Inverted Cross had parallels to bands like King Diamond, combined with a "haunting voice" and "grave sounding guitars". In the book The Ultimate Hard Rock Guide Vol I - Europe, Sorcerer's music is described as epic doom in the style of Solitude Aeturnus. Janne Stark compared the band with Candlemass and Solitude Aeturnus in his book The Heaviest Encyclopedia of Swedish Hard Rock and Heavy Metal Ever!, but referred to the music as progressive doom metal.

In an interview with Patrick Schmidt from Rock Hard magazine, Johnny Hagel stated that besides Solitude Aeturnus, Candlemass, Saint Vitus and Black Sabbath, traditional heavy metal is one of the band's influences. In the same issue, Boris Kaiser stated, in his review of the album, that there were influences from Solitude Aeturnus and Candlemass. The basis of the songs was classical doom metal, with additional influences from hard rock and heavy metal, referring to Rainbow, as did Veni Domine on the album Fall Babylon Fall; he also mentioned Scandinavian melodic and power metal like Memory Garden and Memento Mori as another reference. Sorcerer would also cite Black Sabbath at the time of Headless Cross. Frank Albrecht of the Deaf Forever magazine describes the music as Epic Doom for Candlemass and Solitude Aeturnus worshippers, but not a dull copy, but emphasizing their own features. Because of the demos, the band had a strong reputation.

Discography
 1989: Anno 1503 (demo, self-publication)
 1992: The Inquisition (demo, self-publication)
 1995: Sorcerer (compilation, Brainticket Records)
 2004: Heathens from the North (compilation, Eat Metal Records)
 2015: In the Shadow of the Inverted Cross (Album, Metal Blade Records)
 2016: Black (extended play, Metal Blade Records)
 2017: The Crowning of the Fire King (Album, Metal Blade Records)
2020: Lamenting of the Innocent (Album, Metal Blade Records)
2020: The Quarantine Sessions (single, Desert Plain Records)
2021: Reverence (extended play, Metal Blade Records)

References

Swedish doom metal musical groups
Musical groups established in 1988
Metal Blade Records artists